Andrea Garner (born January 5, 1979) is a former professional basketball player. She won the NCAA Top VIII award in 2000.

Awards and honors

College
Third-team GTE Academic All-American
3x Academic All-Big Ten honoree
NCAA Top VIII award (2000)

Penn State statistics

Source

Personal life
She earned a degree in marketing from Penn State.

References

External links
 

1979 births
Centers (basketball)
Forwards (basketball)
Living people
Seattle Storm players
Penn State Lady Lions basketball players